The Dimasa language is a Sino-Tibetan language spoken by the Dimasa people of the Northeastern Indian states of Assam and Nagaland. The Dimasa language is known to Dimasas as "Grao-Dima" and it is similar to  Boro, Kokborok and Garo languages.

Etymology 
The Dimasa language is one of the oldest languages spoken in North East India, particularly in Assam, Nagaland. The word Dimasa etymologically translates to "Son of the big river" (Dima-river, sa-sons), the river being the mighty Brahmaputra. The Dimasa word "Di"  meaning water, forms the root of the names of many of the major rivers of Assam and of North East India in general, such as Dibang which means plenty of water, Diyung which means huge river, Dikrang, which means green river, Dikhow, which means fetched water, and many others. The mighty river Brahmaputra is known as Dilao (long river) among the Dimasas even now. Many of the important towns and cities in Assam and Nagaland received their names from Dimasa words such as Diphu, Dimapur (a capital of the Dimasa Kingdom), Hojai, Khaspur, etc. In fact, the Dimasa language is one of the last languages of North East India to retain its original vocabulary without being compromised by foreign languages.

Geographical distribution
Dimasa is spoken in:

Assam: Dima Hasao District (formerly North Cachar Hills District), Cachar District, Karbi Anglong District, Nagaon District, Hojai District (formerly a part of Nagaon District)
Nagaland
Meghalaya
Mizoram

Phonology

Vowels
There are six vowels in Dimasa language.

 All vowels can occurs in all three positions, except // which occurs only medially.

Diphthongs

Consonants
There are sixteen consonants in the Dimasa language.

 The three voiceless aspirated stops, //, are unreleased in syllable final position. Their unaspirated voiced counterparts are released and cannot occur word final position.
 Sometimes // are pronounced as // respectively.
 The consonants // can occur in all position.
 The consonants // cannot occur in Dimasa indigenous words, but can occur in loan words.
 The consonants // cannot appear in word final positions in Dimasa.
 The consonants // cannot appear in word initial positions.

Grammar

Dimasa is an inflectional language. The verbs are inflected for number, tense, case, voice, aspect, mood but not for gender and person.

Nouns
The nouns can be proper, common, abstract, collective etc.

Proper nouns
Deringdao (Dimasa male name),
Lairingdi (Dimasa female name)

Common nouns comparison with Garo language
Miya/Mia/Mya (Dimasa) (boy),
Me.a or Me.asa (Garo) (boy)

Masainjik (girl) (Dimasa)
Me.chik (Garo)

Abstract nouns
Khajama (happiness),
Dukhu (sadness)

Pronouns
Ang (1st person singular)Jing (1st person plural)
Ning (2nd person singular)Nisi (2nd person plural)Bo (3rd person singular)Bunsi (3rd person plural)

Adjectives
Guju- Tall, Gedé- big

Sentence syntax
Usually it is of  S+O+V type. For example:      
Ang  (S)      makham (O) jidu (V). That means I am having food. Another one, Bo (S) makham jidu.That means -  He/she is having food. Thus, the verb is rarely inflected for person and gender.

It can also be of the type O+ V+ S.
For example:
Makham (O)    jidu (V)       ang(S). That also means - I am having food.

Writing system
Dimasa is written using Latin script, which has been introduced in the lower primary education system in Dima Hasao District. The main guiding force behind it is the Dimasa Lairidim Hosom, a literary apex body of the Dimasa community.

The Bengali-Assamese script is used in Cachar, where the Bengali people live alongside  Dimasas.

See also
 Dimasa people
 Dimaraji
 Dima Hasao
 Busu Dima

Notes

References

 
 

Sal languages
Languages of Assam
Languages of Nagaland
Endangered languages of India